The Kfar Darom bus attack was a 1995 suicide attack on an Israeli bus carrying civilians and soldiers to Kfar Darom, an Israeli settlement in the Gaza Strip. The attack killed seven Israeli soldiers and one American civilian. The Shaqaqi faction of the Islamic Jihad claimed responsibility for the bombing. A United States Federal district judge ruled that the Iranian Government had provided financial aid to the group that carried out the attack and were therefore responsible for the murder of the U.S. citizen. The court ordered the Government of Iran to pay the victim's family $247.5 million in damages.

The attack 
On the morning of 9 April 1995, Khaled Mohammed Khatib, a construction worker from the Nuseirat refugee camp, waited on the main highway running from Ashkelon to the settlements in the Gaza Strip. At 11:45 AM, he rammed Egged bus 36 carrying more than 60 Israeli soldiers and civilian passengers to the Jewish settlement of Kfar Darom. At the moment he rammed the bus, he flipped a trigger switch in the steering column, detonating a bomb in his car. Seven Israeli soldiers and one American civilian (named Alisa Flatow) were killed and 52 passengers were wounded.

Subsequent attack
Two hours later, Imad Abu Amouna used a suicide car-bomb against an Israeli police-escorted convoy of cars driving towards the Netzarim settlement. Imad Abu Amouna was a Palestinian Islamic Jihad militant who had grown tired of waiting for his "martyrdom operation" and instead volunteered with Hamas. Nobody was killed, but thirty soldiers were wounded. The bomb used by Amouna was designed by Yahya Ayyash.

Lawsuit
The family of the American citizen killed in the attack sued the government of Iran, and in 1998 a Federal district judge ordered the Iranian government to pay $247.5 million in damages to the family.

See also
 Palestinian political violence

References

Further reading

External links 
 In Memory of Alisa Flatow

Arab–Israeli conflict
Palestinian suicide bomber attacks against buses
Attacks on buses by Palestinian militant groups
1995 in the Palestinian territories